Ishrat may refer to:

Syed Ishrat Abbas (1928–1980), stage name Darpan, Pakistani film actor
Ishrat Afreen (born 1956), Urdu poet
Begum Ishrat Ashraf, Pakistani politician, member of the National Assembly of Pakistan
Ishrat Jahan Chaity, Bangladeshi film actress
Ishrat Fatima, former Pakistani newsreader and radio presenter
Ishrat Fatima (footballer), retired Pakistani footballer, the first captain of Pakistan women's national football team
Ishrat Hashmi, Pakistani actress
Ishrat Hussain, Pakistani banker and economist
Ishrat Jahan, practising advocate and former Indian National Congress municipal councillor in Delhi
Ishrat Masroor Quddusi, retired Odisha High Court Judge
Ishrat Ali Siddiqui (1919–2014), Indian poet, former editor of the Urdu daily, Quami Awaz
Ishrat Hussain Usmani (1917–1992), Pakistani atomic physicist, chaired the Pakistan Atomic Energy Commission

See also
Ishrat Jahan case, ongoing case where officers of the Ahmedabad Police Crime Branch and members of the Subsidiary Intelligence Bureau (SIB) of Ahmedabad are accused of shooting dead four people on 15 June 2004